Castle Freak is a 2020 American direct-to-video horror film that was directed by Tate Steinsiek. It has been billed as a reboot of the 1995 Stuart Gordon film by the same name, which is a loose adaptation of the stories "The Outsider" and "The Dunwich Horror" by H.P. Lovecraft.

Plot
Rebecca “Becca” Riley, a young woman who was blinded in an accident caused by her boyfriend John imbibing drugs and alcohol. She was contacted by an estate agent, Marku, who informed Rebecca that she has inherited a castle in Albania from her mother Lavinia Whateley, who gave her up for adoption. Rebecca knows nothing of the woman, particularly that Lavinia had another child that she kept chained in the castle basement and who was freed by an unknown person. John and Rebecca's relationship has become strained after the accident and John's eagerness to sell the castle clashes with her desire to learn about Lavinia.

Once at the castle, Rebecca hears strange sounds and visions, some of which are caused by Lavinia's other offspring. John refuses to believe anything and instead continues to push for the sale of the castle and its furnishings. Things grow more tense between them after four of John's friends arrive, particularly as one of them is a woman John had been flirtatious with in the past, Shelly. Rebecca is pleased, however, to discover that one of the four, The Professor, is willing to listen to her and is also knowledgeable about the occult, having studied at Miskatonic University. The two investigate a Necronomicon Rebecca discovered and find a series of tunnels that go throughout the castle. Exploring the tunnels reveals Lavinia's journal, through which they discover that Lavinia was forcibly impregnated by her father during a ritual to Yog-Sothoth and that she gave birth to twin girls. Rebecca was put up for adoption while the other girl was born deformed and kept captive. Lavinia warns that once the two reunite and join hands, the gate to Yog-Sothoth will be opened. The Professor and Rebecca choose to leave the tunnels but are separated, during which time The Professor comes across Rebecca's sibling. He entreats her to show him "everything", as he wants to learn about the cult and the Elder Gods. She does, in doing so fully converts him into a believer.

Meanwhile, John chooses to have blindfolded sex with Shelly, during which he is unaware that the monstrous sibling has killed Shelly and taken her place for the act. He's discovered afterwards by his remaining two friends and the three of them decide to hunt the murderer. This is unsuccessful, as she slaughters the friends, leaving John alive. Desperate to find Rebecca, John discovers that the monster has kept Marku captive and frees him despite having since learned that he lied about being an estate agent. This proves to be an unwise choice, as Marku betrays John and reveals that the whole goal was to bring the two siblings together and open the gate. John kills Marku and escapes to the outside, where he is attacked.

Rebecca overhears the attack and discovers that he is prepared to kill her sibling. She begs for John to spare her sister, only for John to instead turn on Rebecca and begin to beat her. John is then killed by the sibling. Overwhelmed, Rebecca allows her sister to lead her to the ritual site, where The Professor urges her to embrace her destiny. She obediently takes her sister's hand as the gate opens to allow Yog-Sothoth into the world and Rebecca's body undergoes a monstrous transformation.

In an after credits sequence The Professor enters his professor's office at the university, where he greets a man he calls "West" as a glowing vial sits on the desk.

Cast
 Clair Catherine as Rebecca "Becca" Riley/Whateley
 Jake Horowitz as John
 Chris Galust as The Professor
 Genti Kame as Marku
 Omar Shariff Brunson Jr. as Larry
 Emily Sweet as Shelly
 Klodian Hoxha as Doctor
 Klodjana Keco as Old Timer
 Kika Magalhães as Lavinia Whateley
 Elisha Pratt

Production
On April 15, 2018, it was announced that Cinestate and Charles Band would be producing a remake/reboot of Castle Freak, along with the film's original star Barbara Crampton also producing and special effects artist Tate Steinsiek set to direct. Announcing his involvement with the project on Instagram, Steinsiek wrote, "It's such an honor to be taking not only a Stuart Gordon classic but also embracing the world of Lovecraft." Crampton later announced that the film would feature an "Expanded Lovecraft Universe", with some elements from the first film, while introducing many new characters.

Release
Castle Freak was initially intended to screen at the Chattanooga Film Festival on April 16, 2020, however plans were altered due to the COVID-19 pandemic and the film festival was held online. The film debuted on Shudder on December 3, 2020, followed by a release to VOD and digital HD on December 4, 2020.

Reception

Critical response

JoBlo.com's Arrow in the Head wrote that they wished that Castle Freak had been more ambitious, criticizing the characters as one dimensional and unlikeable while also noting that the movie's kills were satisfying. It was also reviewed by Gruesome Magazine. Culture Crypt rated the movie as 55/100, writing that ""Castle Freak” 2020 reminded me what Full Moon movies were like at their height, with silly storylines, shoddy yet sincere craftsmanship, and midnight movie charm.  For me, I appreciate “Castle Freak” for momentarily bringing back those memories, even though I don't have one of the original."

References

External links
 

2020 films
2020 horror films
2020 direct-to-video films
Direct-to-video horror films
2020s monster movies
American direct-to-video films
American monster movies
Child abuse in fiction
2020s English-language films
Films based on works by H. P. Lovecraft
Films based on short fiction
Films set in Albania
Films set in castles
2020s American films